Team Tyco is a Bermudian Volvo Ocean 60 yacht, designed by Farr Yacht Design in 2000, and built by Eric Goetz Custom Sailboats in Rhode Island. She competed in the 2001–02 Volvo Ocean Race and finished fourth overall, skippered by Kevin Shoebridge.

The yacht is currently owned by Roy Heiner and has been brought back into racing condition, and now has the name "Team Heiner One".  It is usually located in Den Helder (Netherlands), or Portimão (South Portugal). Team Heiner mostly uses the boat for corporate events and management training, but also for competitions such as the Antwerp Race or a spectacular round around Ireland.

Team ABN AMRO used the VO60 for training and preparations for the Volvo Ocean Race 2005-2006.

Crew

References

Sailing yachts of Bermuda
Volvo Ocean 60 yachts
Volvo Ocean Race yachts
2000s sailing yachts